"John" is a synthpop song recorded by French singer Desireless. It was the second single from the album François on which it is the tenth track. Following the huge success of "Voyage Voyage", it was released in May 1988. Written and produced by Jean-Michel Rivat, the song was Desireless' last hit single in France.

Lyrics
"John" deals with a man named John, apparently a soldier, who died during a mission. The lyrics mention several locations referring to conflicts in the 20th century : Hanoi and Haiphong (Vietnam War, 1945-54 / 1964-1975), Madrid (Spanish Civil War, 1936–39), Port Said (second Israeli-Arab war, 1956), Baghdad (Iran-Iraq, 1980–88), Berlin (Second World War, Cold War). Several Gods worshiped in various religions are also cited in the lyrics, such as God, Jehovah (Christianity, Judaism), Allah (Islam), Brahma and Vishnu (Hinduism). The narrator questions whether it matters who the symbolic "John" fought for (On his flag/there are stars, crowns/there are sickles, hammers/What does it matter?"), where he came from (He lives on a farm/in Loir-et-Cher/a tent on the edge of the desert/what does it matter?"), or what religion he was ("He says Bramah/he says Jehovah"), and she says that he "died in mid-flight" over Hanoi or Madrid or "died in flames" south of Baghdad or Port Said.

Critical reception
A review from Music & Media stated: "Although less accessible than "Voyage, Voyage", the single is another driving electro-pop single sporting a passionate, subtle chorus. Production by Michel Rivat is excellent and carries that special,
spatial atmosphere, so suitable for the pan-European market".

Chart performance
Released in several European countries, notably in France, where it became a top five hit in July 1988 and remained for 18 weeks on the chart (top 50), nine of them in the top ten. It was released in UK in a remixed version produced by Les Adams, but was a relative failure (a sole week on the chart, at number 92), while it failed the chart in the Netherlands. Yet, the song was a big hit - as its predecessor - in Spain, reaching n°8.

Versions
An acoustic version of "John" was recorded by Desireless on her 2004 album Un brin de paille, on her 2007 double album More Love and Good Vibrations and on her 2003 best of Ses plus grands succès. The image on the single cover is a screenshot from the music video. A new arrangement of the song was produced with Desireless' new musical partner, Antoine Aureche (AKA Operation of the Sun) for the 2013 album L'Oeuf de Dragon.

Track listings
 7" single
 "John" – 3:58
 "John" (tempo 120) – 4:12

 12" maxi
 "John" (remix) – 6:28
 "John" – 4:21

 CD maxi
 "John" – 4:19
 "John" (remix) – 6:27
 "Voyage Voyage" (extended remix) – 6:45

 7" single - Remix
 "John" (London remix) – 4:14
 "John" (London re-remix) – 4:14

 12" maxi - Remix
 "John" (London remix) – 6:17
 "John" (London remix - single version) – 4:11
 "Voyage Voyage" (britmix) – 7:06

Credits
 Chorus by Desireless and Michel Laurent
 Mixed by Dominique Blanc-Francard and S.Prestage, at Digital Services
 Recorded at Studio Colour by Antoine Cambourakis and Steve Prestage
 Photography by François De La Noisette
 Written, arranged and produced by Jean-Michel Rivat
 Editions : Rivat Music

Charts and certifications

Weekly charts

Year-end charts

Certifications

References

External links
 "John", music video (official site)

1988 singles
Anti-war songs
Desireless songs
1986 songs
CBS Records singles